Damien Megherbi is a French producer, best known for producing Yves Piat's short film Nefta Football Club which received critical acclaim and was nominated for the 2020 Academy Award for Best Live Action Short Film and 2020 César Award for Best Short Film.

Life and career
In 2013 he co-founded the production and distribution company Les Valseurs with Justin Pechberty. He received the Best Animated Short Film Award at Ottawa International Animation Festival two years in a row (for producing Wicked Girl in 2017 and Guaxuma in 2018).

In March 2019, his short film production Guaxuma received the Best Animated Film Award at SXSW. In May 2019, his live action short production She Runs received the "Leitz Cine Discovery Prize for Short Film" at Cannes' International Critics' Week.

In September 2019, France Télévisions awarded him together with Justin Pechberty the "Jeune Producteur" €30,000-price. In January 2020, he received an Oscar nomination for the short film Nefta Football Club by Yves Piat. The same month, Nefta Football Club was nominated for a César Award for Best Short Film.

Filmography

Live Action
 La Muerte de un Perro (2019) by Matìas Ganz – producer
 Fendas (2019) by Carlos Segundo – producer
 Midnight Ramblers (2017) by Julian Ballester – producer
 She Runs (2019) by Qiu Yang (short film) – producer
 The Diver (2019) by Michael Leonard & Jamie Helmer (short film) – producer
 Nefta Football Club (2018) by Yves Piat (short film) – producer
 Meninas Formicida (2017) by João Paulo Miranda Maria (short film) – producer

Animation
 Wicked Girl (2017) by Ayce Kartal (short film) – producer
 Guaxuma (2019) by Nara Normande (short film) – producer

Documentary
 Après Ta Révolte, Ton Vote (2019) by Kiswendsida Parfait Kaboré – producer

References

External links
 Les Valseurs' official website
 

Year of birth missing (living people)
Living people
French film producers